The International Communion of the Charismatic Episcopal Church (also known as the ICCEC) is an international Christian communion established as an Autocephalous Patriarchate in 1992 with over 1,000 churches worldwide.

Beginnings of convergence: 1976–1991 
1976-1977: "The Chicago Call", is issued by the National Conference of Evangelicals for Historic Christianity, meeting in Warrenville, Illinois. Led by Dr. Robert E. Webber (Assoc. Professor of Theology at Wheaton University), along with Peter E. Gillquist, Thomas Howard, Richard Holt, Donald Bloesch, Jan Dennis, Lane Dennis, and Victor Oliver, the Conference discusses the need for evangelical Christians to rediscover and re-attach to the Church's historic roots. Sections of The Chicago Call include: A Call to Historic Roots and Continuity; A Call to Biblical Fidelity; A Call to Creedal Identity; A Call to Holistic Salvation; A Call to Sacramental Integrity; A Call to Spirituality; A Call to Church Authority; and A Call to Church Unity.

1980s: Pastor Adler is mentored as a "prophet" by Dr. Bill Hamon of the Christian International School of Theology in Phoenix, Arizona (relocated in 1984 to Santa Rosa Beach, Florida). Bill Hamon was instrumental in founding the modern "prophetic movement" in the charismatic churches, holding seminars and writing books on such topics as "personal prophecy" and seeking to restore the offices of Prophet and Apostle in the church.

ICCEC establishment: 1992–1994 
1992: On June 26, Randolph Adler is consecrated a bishop by Bishop Timothy Barker of the International Free Catholic Communion.

The Charismatic Episcopal Church of North America (CEC) is formed with four congregations, including St. Michael's Pro-Cathedral. Bishop Adler is designated Primate.

Rapid growth: 1995–2001 
1996: The ICCEC holds its first international convocation in Jacksonville, Florida, with 1,000 people in attendance.

ICCEC bishops begin seeking a line of apostolic succession that will be recognized as valid by the Roman Catholic Church. In the summer, two bishops make contact with the Igreja Catolica Apostolica Brasileira (ICAB), the Brazilian Catholic Apostolic Church. ICAB's line of apostolic succession comes through its founder, former Roman Catholic bishop Carlos Duarte Costa of Brazil, who left the Roman Catholic Church in 1945. Current ICAB patriarch Luiz Fernando Castillo Mendez begins talks with the ICCEC about passing on its apostolic succession.

Consolidation: 2002–present 
2002: The ICCEC publishes 2002 data on the number of clergy and congregations around the world.
 Kenya: 140 clergy, 320 congregations
 Uganda: 200 clergy, 264 congregations
 U.S.A.: 400 clergy, 136 parishes
 Philippines: 4 bishops, many other clergy, 40 congregations
 24 Filipino congregations in Europe
 Pakistan: 21 parishes
 Brazil: 6 parishes
 Canada: 8 clergy, 4 congregations
 Burundi, Congo, Rwanda, Sudan, Tanzania - several congregations each.
 Germany, Estonia, Latvia, Portugal, Switzerland – at least one congregation each

2007: October 15, 2007, Patriarch Adler retired from the Office of the Patriarch; Archbishop Hines, Primate of Asia, assumed the office being the senior member of the Patriarch's Council.

References

External links

ICCEC article "Ten Years of Making Visible the Kingdom of God"

Charismatic denominations